Patricia Diane Foster (3 March 1928 – 4 January 1999) was a Canadian track and field athlete, who mainly competed in the 100 metres. Foster was born in Vancouver, British Columbia. She competed for Canada at the 1948 Summer Olympics held in London, United Kingdom, where she won the bronze medal in the women's 4 × 100 metres relay with her teammates Viola Myers, Nancy MacKay and Patricia Jones.

References

Sports Reference

1928 births
1999 deaths
Athletes from Vancouver
Canadian female sprinters
Olympic track and field athletes of Canada
Olympic bronze medalists for Canada
Olympic bronze medalists in athletics (track and field)
Athletes (track and field) at the 1948 Summer Olympics
Medalists at the 1948 Summer Olympics
Olympic female sprinters
20th-century Canadian women